Bab Bachir (died 1254) was a slave consort of the last Abbasid caliph, al-Musta'sim (r. 1242–1258) and mother of Abu Nasr Muhammad ibn al-Musta'sim.

She was a slave bought to the Harem by the Caliph.

When she gave birth to a son, prince Abu Nasr Muhammad, she became an umm walad and was manumitted by the Caliph, who married her.

After her marriage, she made herself known for her public charitable initiatives, which was a common method for the consorts of the Caliph (who could not leave the harem), to make themselves known.

She is known as the founder of the Al Bashiriya School, East of the Sheikh Maarouf Cemetery in Baghdad. The work on the school begun in 1251/1252, and a great public inauguration ceremony was held 1255/1256.

References

1254 deaths
Wives of Abbasid caliphs
Slaves from the Abbasid Caliphate
13th-century women from the Abbasid Caliphate
Slave concubines
Concubines of the Abbasid caliphs